Hans Christopher Steinfeld (born December 14, 1959 in Denver, Colorado) is a former American competitive sailor and Olympic silver medalist.

Career

At the 1984 Summer Olympics, Steinfeld finished in 2nd place in the 470 class Mixed Two-Person Dinghy along with his partner Steve Benjamin.

References

 

1959 births
American male sailors (sport)
Sailors at the 1984 Summer Olympics – 470
Olympic silver medalists for the United States in sailing
Living people
Sportspeople from Denver
Medalists at the 1984 Summer Olympics